WorldRemit is a digital cross border remittance business that provides international money transfer and remittance services in more than 130 countries and over 70 currencies. It was founded in 2010 by Ismail Ahmed, Catherine Wines, and Richard Igoe.

History 
WorldRemit was founded in 2010 by Ismail Ahmed, a former compliance advisor to the United Nations Development Programme. In October 2018, the firm announced that he would be stepping into the role of executive chairman and the company would be bringing in Breon Corcoran as CEO. During his tenure WorldRemit acquired SendWave and Zepz was created as the group business housing both the WorldRemit and SendWave brands and businesses. Breon Corcoran left the organization in August of 2022 when Mark Lenhard, former COO of bill.com, was appointed Group CEO of Zepz.

Operations 

WorldRemit focuses on cross border remittance money transfers from over 50 countries to over 130 countries around the world. For those receiving money, it offers pay out options including bank deposit, mobile money, mobile airtime top-up and cash pick-up as well as cash delivery.

The firm has a network of more than 5,000 corridors. It is connected to mobile money services globally, including Zaad (Somaliland), M-Pesa (Kenya), MTN (Africa and Asia), and bKash (Bangladesh). As of October 2019, it can send funds to 115 different countries; this includes all African countries except for Sudan, South Sudan, Eswatini, Eritrea, Libya, and Algeria.

In 2021 WorldRemit acquired Sendwave, another cross-border digital payments company. In 2020 the two processed 50m transactions and facilitated the sending of over $10bn.

Funding 
WorldRemit is backed by venture capital companies Accel Partners and Technology Crossover Ventures (TCV).

In February 2015 the firm announced a $100m Series B funding round led by TCV. It was also announced that TCV General Partner John Rosenberg would join its board.

In 2017, the firm received  $40 million  in their Series C round of funding, with LeapFrog Investments   the lead investor . In 2019, it raised a $175 million Series D funding round, led by TCV, Accel,  and Leapfrog Investments.

References

Financial services companies established in 2010
Online remittance providers
Foreign exchange companies
Electronic funds transfer
Financial services companies of the United Kingdom
2010 establishments in England